Gabrielle Walsh  is an American actress. She is best known for her roles as Marisol in the found footage supernatural horror film Paranormal Activity: The Marked Ones (2014), and as Jess in the science fiction thriller The Hive (2014). Walsh has also appeared on various television series, most notably Shameless, The Vampire Diaries,  From Dusk till Dawn: The Series, and recently Close Enough.

Early life and education
She is originally from Indian Head Park, Illinois and graduated from Lyons Township High School in 2007. She is of mixed African-American and Irish descent. She has a daughter named Layla Brianna Barnett.

Filmography

Film

Television

References

Further reading

External links

Actresses from Chicago
American film actresses
Living people
American television actresses
American voice actresses
African-American actresses
21st-century American actresses
21st-century African-American women
20th-century African-American women
Year of birth missing (living people)